Silvia Arber (born 1968 in Geneva) is a Swiss neurobiologist. She teaches and researches at both the Biozentrum of the University of Basel and the Friedrich Miescher Institute for Biomedical Research in Basel Switzerland.

Education 
Silvia Arber studied biology at the Biozentrum of the University of Basel and completed her doctorate in 1995 at the Friedrich Miescher Institute (FMI) in Basel.

Career and research
Arber subsequently worked as a postdoctoral fellow at the Columbia University in New York City. In 2000, she returned to Basel as a Professor of Neurobiology andCell Biology continuing her research work and teaching at the Biozentrum as well as at the FMI. 

Arber's research investigates the mechanisms involved in the function and assembly of neuronal circuits controlling motor behavior. She has shown that premotor interneuron groups differ from each other in their functionality and distribution in the spinal cord and that this property depends on the timing of their generation during development.

She serves as a member of the Editorial Board for Cell.

Awards and honors 
 1998: Pfizer Forschungspreis
 2003: National Latsis Prize
 2005: elected Member of the European Molecular Biology Organization (EMBO)
 2005: Schellenberg Prize
 2008: Friedrich Miescher Award
 2009: European Research Council (ERC) Advanced Investigators Grant
 2014: Otto Naegeli Prize
 2014: elected Member of the Academia Europaea (MAE)
 2017: Louis-Jeantet Prize for Medicine
 2018: W. Alden Spencer Award
 2018: Pradel Research Award
 2019: Physiological Society Annual Review Prize Lecture
 2020: Elected a member of the National Academy of Sciences of the United States
 2022: The Brain Prize

Personal life
Arber is the daughter of the Swiss microbiologist and geneticist Werner Arber, who in 1978 was awarded the Nobel Prize for Physiology or Medicine.

References 

Living people
Columbia University fellows
Members of the European Molecular Biology Organization
Biozentrum University of Basel
Members of the United States National Academy of Sciences
University of Basel alumni
Swiss women neuroscientists
1968 births
Scientists from Geneva